Mark Whitzell (born 18 January 1964) is a former Australian rules footballer who played with the Sydney Swans in the Victorian Football League (VFL).

Career
Whitzell, who came from Altona North and Brooklyn YC, was a Victorian Teal Cup representative in 1981. Described by teammate Dermott Brereton as having "more tattoos than Angry Anderson", Whitzell made his league debut for South Melbourne a few weeks later, as a 17-year-old. That appearance, against Fitzroy at Lake Oval, would remain his only senior game until 1983, by which time the club had relocated to Sydney. He played four league games in 1983 and continued to make only occasional senior appearances for Sydney over the next three years. In 1987 he played for Port Melbourne in the Victorian Football Association and polled the equal second most votes (17) at the J. J. Liston Trophy.

References

External links

1964 births
Australian rules footballers from Victoria (Australia)
Sydney Swans players
Port Melbourne Football Club players
Living people